Herbert Adamski (30 April 1910 – 11 August 1941) was a German rower from Berlin who competed in the 1936 Summer Olympics.

In 1936 he won the gold medal as member of the German boat in the coxed pair competition. He was killed during WWII while serving on the Eastern Front.

References

External links
 Database Olympics profile

1910 births
1941 deaths
Rowers from Berlin
Olympic rowers of Germany
Rowers at the 1936 Summer Olympics
Olympic gold medalists for Germany
Olympic medalists in rowing
German male rowers
Medalists at the 1936 Summer Olympics
German military personnel killed in World War II
European Rowing Championships medalists